Roderick Earl Jones (March 3, 1964 – December 8, 2018) was a professional American football tight end for three seasons for the Kansas City Chiefs and the Seattle Seahawks in the National Football League.

Early life
Born in Richmond, California, Jones attended El Cerrito High School, a public school in nearby El Cerrito, played defensive end and tight end on the football team, and graduated in 1982.

Career
Jones played college football at the University of Washington in Seattle under head coach Don James. He was part of the 1984 team that beat Oklahoma in the Orange Bowl and finished the season at  earning a national title.  in his senior season of 1986, he left with the all-time receiving record for a UW tight end, with 

Selected by the New York Giants in the eighth round of the 1987 NFL Draft, Jones played two seasons with the Kansas City Chiefs and one with the Seattle Seahawks in 1989. He then returned to the University of Washington, earning a degree in Ethnic Studies in 2000. Jones went on to spend nearly two decades within the athletic department as an

Death
Following a recent diagnosis of early-onset dementia at age 54, Jones shot himself in the head in his Seattle home and died several hours later at Harborview Medical Center.  decided to donate his brain to the Boston University School of Medicine for CTE research.

References

External links

 

1964 births
2018 deaths
Sportspeople from Richmond, California
Players of American football from Seattle
Players of American football from California
American football tight ends
Washington Huskies football players
Kansas City Chiefs players
Seattle Seahawks players
National Football League replacement players
Suicides by firearm in Washington (state)
2018 suicides